indicates a color difference signal between Blue (B) and a Luminance component, as part of a Luminance (Y) and Chrominance (C) color model. 
It has different meanings depending on the exact model used:
U  in YUV, a generic model used for analog and digital image formats;
Cb in YCbCr, used for digital images and video;
Pb in YPbPr, used in analog component video;
Db in YDbDr, used in analog SECAM and PAL-N;

See also
R-Y